Skotani (Greek: Σκοτάνη, before 1928: Κόκοβα - Kokova), is a small mountain village in the municipal unit of Paion, Achaea, Greece. In 2011 its population was 60 for the village and 99 for the community, which includes the village Agios Georgios. Skotani is 5 km east of Chovoli, 7 km northeast of Dafni, 7 km southwest of Kleitoria and 20 km south of Kalavryta. Its elevation is about 700 m above sea level.

Population

History

Scotane was a town of ancient Arcadian Azania and was part of the city-state of Kleitor in classical antiquity. It was located near the river Ladon and the Soron forest. Settlements near Skotane were Lykountes (near present Filia) and Argeathoi.

See also

List of settlements in Achaea

References

External links
Skotani at the GTP Travel Pages

Populated places in Achaea